The Riverside County Transportation Commission (RCTC) is the County Transportation Commission (a subdivision of the six-county Southern California Association of Governments metropolitan planning organization) for Riverside County, California, United States. It is an association of local governments in the county, with policy makers consisting of mayors, councilmembers, and county supervisors, and is the funding agency for the county's transit systems, which include Corona Cruiser, Riverside Transit Agency, SunLine Transit Agency, Pass Transit Agency and Palo Verde Valley Transit Agency. It also provides funds for city transit in Corona and Riverside and is one of Metrolink's five governing agencies. It is additionally the planning agency for the Coachella Valley–San Gorgonio Pass Rail Corridor Service.

See also
 Transportation in the Inland Empire

References

External links 
Riverside County Transportation Commission
Metrolink

County government agencies in California
Government in Riverside County, California
Transportation in Riverside County, California
Organizations based in Riverside County, California